James Michael "M. J." Walker Jr. (born March 28, 1998) is an American professional basketball player for the Westchester Knicks of the NBA G League. He played college basketball for Florida State Seminoles.

High school career

Walker attended Jonesboro High School in Jonesboro, Georgia. He initially played football but he decided to focus on basketball after the summer of 2016. As a sophomore in 2014–15, Walker averaged 17.3 points, 4.5 rebounds, 3.0 assists, and 3.0 steals leading Jonesboro to a 32–1 record and the 2015 Georgia Class 4A state championship. As a junior in 2015–16, Walker averaged 22.3 points, 5.6 rebounds, and 3.6 assists leading Jonesboro to a 28–5 record, regional title, and 2015 state title. As a senior in 2016–17, Walker averaged 27.8 points, 6.5 rebounds, and 2.4 assists leading Jonesboro to a 23–6 record.

Recruiting
Walker was a five-star recruit who received offers from Florida State, Georgia Tech, Ohio State, UCLA, and Virginia Tech. Walker committed to playing college basketball for Florida State.

College career
As a sophomore, Walker averaged 7.5 points and 2.2 rebounds per game. Florida State compiled a 29–8 record and reached the Sweet Sixteen of the NCAA Tournament. At the conclusion of his junior season, Walker was named All-ACC Honorable Mention. As a senior, he averaged 12.2 points, 2.5 rebounds, and 2.5 assists per game, earning Second Team All-ACC honors. Following the season, he declared for the 2021 NBA draft, forgoing the additional season of eligibility granted by the NCAA due to the COVID-19 pandemic.

Professional career

Westchester Knicks (2021)
After going undrafted in the 2021 NBA draft, Walker signed with the New York Knicks on August 20, 2021, but was waived on October 16.  In October 2021, he joined the Westchester Knicks as an affiliate player. Walker averaged 10.2 points, 3.5 rebounds and 2.7 assists per game.

Phoenix Suns (2021–2022)
He signed a 10-day COVID-19 hardship exemption contract with the Phoenix Suns on December 30, 2021. He appeared briefly in two games for the Suns that season.

Return to the Knicks (2022–present)
On January 9, 2022, Walker was reacquired by the Westchester Knicks. On September 22, Walker resigned with the Knicks on a training camp deal but was waived a day later.

On October 24, 2022, Walker was named to the training camp roster for the Knicks.

National team career
Walker played for the United States national under-18 team at the 2016 FIBA Americas Under-18 Championship in Valdivia, Chile. In four games, he averaged 2 points and 1.8 rebounds per game, helping his team win the gold medal.

Career statistics

NBA

|-
| style="text-align:left;"|
| style="text-align:left;"|Phoenix
| 2 || 0 || 4.2 || .000 || .000 ||  || .5 || .5 || 1.0 || .0 || .0
|- class="sortbottom"
| style="text-align:center;" colspan="2"|Career
| 2 || 0 || 4.2 || .000 || .000 ||  || .5 || .5 || 1.0 || .0 || .0

College

|-
| style="text-align:left;"| 2017–18
| style="text-align:left;"| Florida State
| 35 || 1 || 18.8 || .379 || .345 || .754 || 1.7 || 1.1 || .6 || .1 || 7.0
|-
| style="text-align:left;"| 2018–19
| style="text-align:left;"| Florida State
| 35 || 34 || 25.9 || .340 || .328 || .778 || 2.2 || 1.6 || .8 || .2 || 7.5
|-
| style="text-align:left;"| 2019–20
| style="text-align:left;"| Florida State
| 26 || 24 || 25.2 || .371 || .361 || .803 || 1.7 || 1.5 || .8 || .2 || 10.6
|-
| style="text-align:left;"| 2020–21
| style="text-align:left;"| Florida State
| 24 || 23 || 29.0 || .436 || .423 || .797 || 2.5 || 2.5 || .9 || .4 || 12.2
|- class="sortbottom"
| style="text-align:center;" colspan="2"| Career
| 120 || 82 || 24.3 || .380 || .361 || .785 || 2.0 || 1.6 || .8 || .2 || 9.0

Personal life
Walker is the son of James and Jackie Walker, and has an older sister, Amoni, who plays for Miles College. His father, James, played college basketball at Norfolk State University and his mother, Jackie, played women's college basketball for Hampton University.

References

External links
Florida State Seminoles bio
USA Basketball bio

1998 births
Living people
21st-century African-American sportspeople
African-American basketball players
American men's basketball players
Basketball players from Georgia (U.S. state)
Florida State Seminoles men's basketball players
McDonald's High School All-Americans
People from Jonesboro, Georgia
Phoenix Suns players
Shooting guards
Sportspeople from the Atlanta metropolitan area
Undrafted National Basketball Association players
Westchester Knicks players